Dionisius (variously transliterated as  Dionisy or Dionysiy; also Dionisius the Wise; c. 1440 – 1502) was acknowledged as a head of the Moscow school of icon painters at the turn of the 15th and 16th centuries. His style of painting is sometimes termed "the Muscovite mannerism".

Work
Dionisy's first important commission was a series of icons for the Cathedral of the Dormition in the Moscow Kremlin, executed in 1481. The figures on his icons are famously elongated, the hands and feet are diminutive, and the faces serene and peaceful.

Among his many rich and notable patrons, Joseph of Volokolamsk alone commissioned him to paint more than eighty icons, primarily for the Joseph-Volokolamsk and Pavel-Obnorsk cloisters.

The most comprehensive and the best preserved work of Dionisy is the monumental fresco painting of the Virgin Nativity Cathedral of the Ferapontov Monastery (1495–96) in Vologda Oblast. The frescoes, depicting scenes from the life of the Virgin in singularly pure and gentle colours, are permeated with a solemn and festal mood.

The work at the Ferapontov was executed by Dionisy in collaboration with his sons and disciples, who continued a Dionisiesque tradition after the master's death. His son Feodosy painted the mural of "Michael and Joshua before the battle of Jericho" in the Cathedral of the Annunciation of the Moscow Kremlin in 1508. As his father did not take part in this important commission, it is thought that he had died shortly before that date.

References

External links

Online museum of Dionisius art

Russian painters
Russian male painters
Russian icon painters
1440s births
1502 deaths
16th-century Russian painters
Medieval Russian artists
Medieval Russian painters